The Awali ( / ALA-LC: Nahr al-Awalī, ancient Bostrenus / Bostrenos) is a perennial river flowing in Southern Lebanon. In ancient times it was known as the River Asclepius.

The Awali is supplemented by two tributaries, the Barouk and Aaray rivers. The Awali is also known as the Bisri river in its upper section; it flows through the western face of Mount Lebanon and into the Mediterranean. The river flows into Joun Lake, which is part of the Bisri Dam project to improve the supply of fresh water to the region. A large portion of the Bisri Dam project funding, from the World Bank, was cancelled by the World Bank in September 2020.

References

Rivers of Lebanon